Bocaddon is a hamlet in Cornwall, England, UK. It is in the civil parish of Lanreath and is half-a-mile north of Lanreath village, six miles (10 km) south-west of Liskeard.

References

External links

Hamlets in Cornwall